Claudio Patrignani (born 9 January 1959 in Fano, Pesaro e Urbino) is a retired male middle distance runner from Italy.

He competed for his native country at the 1984 Summer Olympics in Los Angeles, California. Patrignani set his personal best (3:36.08) in the men's 1,500 metres in 1983. He has 38 caps in national team from 1979 to 1986.

International competitions

National titles
Patrignani has won 8 times the individual national championship.
5 wins in the 1500 metres (1981, 1982, 1983, 1984, 1987)
3 wins in the 1500 metres indoor (1979, 1983, 1986)

See also
 Italian all-time lists - 1500 metres

References

External links
 

1959 births
Living people
Italian male middle-distance runners
Athletes (track and field) at the 1984 Summer Olympics
Olympic athletes of Italy
World Athletics Championships athletes for Italy
Universiade medalists in athletics (track and field)
Universiade gold medalists for Italy
Medalists at the 1983 Summer Universiade